Scinax villasboasi is a frog in the family Hylidae.  It is endemic to Brazil.  Scientists know it exclusively from its type locality: Campo de Provas in  Pará.

References

Frogs of South America
villasboasi

Endemic fauna of Brazil